Alden B. Dow (April 10, 1904 – August 20, 1983) was an American architect based in Midland, Michigan, and known for his contributions to the style of Michigan Modern. During a career that spanned from the 1930s to the 1960s, he designed more than 70 residences and dozens of churches, schools, civic and art centers, and commercial buildings. His personal residence, the Midland Center for the Arts, and the 1950s Grace A. Dow Memorial Library (named in honor of his mother) are among numerous examples of his work located in his hometown of Midland, Michigan. The son of Herbert Henry Dow (founder of the Dow Chemical Company) and philanthropist Grace A. Dow, Dow is known for his prolific architectural designs.

Biography

Education
Alden B. Dow attended the Midland Public Schools through high school. He attended the University of Michigan to study engineering in preparation to join his father's chemical manufacturing company. After three years, Dow transferred as a student of architecture at Columbia University, where he graduated in 1931.

That year he married Vada Bennett, also of Midland. Her father Earl Bennett worked at the Dow Chemical Company, a major employer in the city. The couple had three children together: Michael Lloyd Dow, Mary Lloyd Dow, and Barbara Alden Dow.

After working for a year and a half with the architectural firm of Frantz and Spence in nearby Saginaw, he and Vada studied with architect Frank Lloyd Wright at his Taliesin studio in Spring Green, Wisconsin, for the summer in 1933.

Early career

Following his brief ("a few months" ) apprenticeship with Frank Lloyd Wright, Dow opened his own studio in 1934 in Midland.

Dow described his own philosophy of design as "Architecture is more than the front face of the building. It is the location of the building. It is the plan of the building. It is the construction of the building. It is the heating and cooling of the building. It is the furnishing of the building. It is the landscaping of the building. It is, in its entirety, the manifestation of wholesome living."

He received the Diplome de Grand Prix at that 1937 Paris International Exposition for best residential design in the world, based on the design of his residence and also for his work on the John Whitman residence.

In 1941, Dow officially incorporated his business as Alden B. Dow, Inc. The following year, Dow was tasked with designing a company town in Texas for workers at his father's Dow Chemical Company's site near Freeport, Texas. With his brother Willard and Dow Chemical Company executive A.P. Beutel, Dow chose a site west of Freeport that was formerly the site of the Abner Jackson Plantation. Dow designed the town, which they named Lake Jackson, to hold 5,000 people. The residential layout was notable for its lack of straight streets; Dow felt that winding roads would provide "something of a surprise around each turn."  The streets were given whimsical names, including the intersecting "This Way" and "That Way" as well as "Circle Way,"  "Winding Way," and "Any Way." Dow also provided the six designs used to build different models of houses within the newly created town. The first residents moved in at the end of 1943.

Growth
In 1963 he changed the business name to Alden B. Dow Associates, Inc., to reflect taking on more employees to accommodate growth. Dow designed the Fleming Administration Building at the University of Michigan in Ann Arbor, completed in 1968. The building houses the offices of the university's president. Its narrow windows (all located above the first floor) and fortress-like exterior led to a campus rumor that it was designed in the wake of the student activism of the 1960s to be riot-proof. Dow was purportedly offended by those rumors, insisting that the small windows were designed to be energy efficient.

As time passed, Dow began to delve into other types of architecture, designing many commercial and community buildings, especially in and around his hometown of Midland. Dow relinquished the chairmanship of his company in 1974 to Jim Howell.

In 1983 Dow was named the architect laureate of Michigan, an achievement in his 50-year career. He died shortly after, on August 20, 1983. That title has not been bestowed on anyone since Dow.

The company name was changed to Dow, Howell & Gilmore Associates Inc. after his death. It is owned by its employees.

Six years later, in 1989, Dow's residence was designated as a National Historic Landmark, both for its own architectural significance and the contributions of his career to national American architecture.

Selected works

Midland
Midland Country Club (1930), Midland, Michigan (demolished 2010)
Residential Architecture of Alden B. Dow in Midland, Michigan Multiple Property Submission, a National Register of Historic Places Multiple Property Submission consisting of the following 13 houses built in Midland, Michigan, from 1933 to 1938:
Earl Stein House (1933), 209 Revere, Midland, Michigan
F.W. Lewis House (1934), 2913 Manor, Midland, Michigan
Joseph A. Cavanagh House (1934), 415 W. Main, Midland, Michigan
Sheldon Heath House (1934), 1505 W. St. Andrews, Midland, Michigan
Alden Hanson House (1935), 1605 W. St. Andrews, Midland, Michigan
John S. Whitman House (1935), 2407 Manor, Midland, Michigan 
Alden Dow House and Studio (1936), 315 Post St., Midland, Michigan, a National Historic Landmark
Charles MacCallum House (1936), 1227 W. Sugnet, Midland, Michigan
Howard Ball House (1935), 1411 W. St. Andrews, Midland, Michigan
Oscar C. Diehl House (1935), 919 E. Park, Midland, Michigan
George Greene House (1936), 1115 W. Sugnet, Midland, Michigan
Donald L. Conner House (1936), 2705 Manor, Midland, Michigan
James T. Pardee House (1936), 812 W. Main St., Midland, Michigan
Dow Chemical Company Administrative Building (1937), also known as Dow Chemical Main Office, Midland, Michigan 
Midland Central Park Bandshell (1938), Midland, Michigan
Midland Central Park Pool and Bathhouse (1938), Midland, Michigan
Parents' and Children's Schoolhouse (1938), 1505 Crane Ct., Midland, Michigan, NRHP-listed
Calvin A. and Alta Koch Campbell House (1939), 1210 W. Park Dr., Midland, Michigan, NRHP-listed
Mr. and Mrs. Robert C. Reinke House (1941), 33 Lexington Court, Midland, Michigan, NRHP-listed
Mr. and Mrs Frank Boonstra House (1941), 1401 Helen St., Midland, Michigan, NRHP-listed
Donald and Louise Clark Irish House (1941), 1801 W. Sugnet Rd., Midland, Michigan, NRHP-listed
Mr. and Mrs. Louis P. Butenschoen House (1941), 1212 Helen St., Midland, Michigan, NRHP-listed
Charles and Mary Kempf Penhaligen House (1941), 1203 W. Sugnet Rd., Midland, Michigan, NRHP-listed
Midland Hospital (1943), later known as MidMichigan Medical Center-Midland, built around a courtyard garden, Midland, Michigan
Grace A. Dow Memorial Library (1953), Midland, Michigan
Midland Community Center (1953), Midland, Michigan
Midland Skating Rink (1954), Midland, Michigan (demolished 2006)
Fire Station No. 1 (1955), Midland, Michigan
Midland County Courthouse Jail and Office addition (1955), 301 West Main Street, Midland, Michigan
St. John's Lutheran Church (1955), 505 East Carpenter Street, Midland, Michigan
King's Daughters Home (1956), Midland, Michigan
Midland Center for the Arts (1968), Midland, Michigan
Dow Gardens Master Plan (1974), Midland, Michigan
Lower Pond Bridge and Upper Pond Bridge (1975), Midland, Michigan
Farmers Market (1973), Midland, Michigan
Visitor Center (1976), Midland, Michigan
Sun Bridge (1979), Midland, Michigan
Chemical Bank and Trust Company, Midland, Michigan
Dow Center Complex, Midland, Michigan
First United Methodist Church, Midland, Michigan

Other Tri-Cities (along with Midland)
 Bay City, Bay County War Memorial
 Bay City, Thomas and Marjorie Defoe House (1949)
 Bay City, Messiah Evangelical Lutheran Church (1956) 
 Bay City, People's National Bank and Trust Company (1962)
 Saginaw, Mary Dow House (1936)

Ann Arbor

 Harry and Margaret Towsley House (1932), Ann Arbor, Michigan, built for Dow's sister and her husband. It was the "first residence in the country designed with an attached garage facing the street."  
University of Michigan Women's Swimming Pool, Margaret Bell Building (1950), Ann Arbor, Michigan
 Ann Arbor Public Library (1955 or 1956), Ann Arbor, Michigan
 University of Michigan Botanical Gardens (1958), Ann Arbor, Michigan
Ann Arbor Community Center (1958), Ann Arbor, Michigan
Dunbar Community Center (1958), Ann Arbor, Michigan
Leonard Service Station (1960), Ann Arbor, Michigan
Institute for Social Research (1960), University of Michigan, Ann Arbor, Michigan
 Ann Arbor City Hall (1960), also known as Guy C. Larcom, Jr. Municipal Building, 301 East Huron Street, Ann Arbor, Michigan
 Conductron Corporation Offices (1961), Ann Arbor, Michigan
University Microfilms Building (1963), Ann Arbor, Michigan
Fleming Administration Building (1964), Ann Arbor, Michigan
University of Michigan Continuing Education Center (1965), Ann Arbor, Michigan
Greenhills School (1967), 850 Greenhills Dr., Ann Arbor, Michigan

Bloomfield Hills
 Gordon Saunders House (1936)
 Hellenic Orthodox Community Church of St. George (1962), also known as Saint George Greek Orthodox Church, 43816 Woodward Avenue
 Lynn A. & Ruth M. Townsend House (1963), 1485 Kirkway

Kalamazoo
 Paul & Josephine C. Rood House (1937)
 Kalamazoo Christian Church (1957)
 Kalamazoo Nature Center (1961)
 Kalamazoo Valley Community College (1966)

Elsewhere

Michigan
 Algonac, LeRoy Smith House (1940), 9503 Frank St., NRHP-listed
 Dearborn, First Presbyterian Church (1964)
 Detroit, Wayne State University Center Building (1963)
 Detroit, Wayne State University Physical Education & Recreation Building (1961)
 East Lansing, Bachman House (1936)
 East Lansing, Eastminster Presbyterian Church (1961) 
East Grand Rapids, Miner Keeler residence, 2525 Indian Trl SE (1958) 
 Grosse Pointe Farms 96 Handy RD (1939/1940) Clark & Mary Wells House
Grosse Pointe Park, Pryor House (1936)
 Mount Pleasant, Brown House (1937)
 Muskegon, Muskegon Community College (1965)
 Midland, Northwood University (1960's)
 Port Huron, Henry McMorran Auditorium and Sports Arena (1961)
 Roscommon, Michigan, Earl Bennett Cottage (1936), Benmark's Club

Other states
 Phoenix, Arizona, Phoenix Civic Center and Art Museum (1954), with Blaine Drake
 Elkhart, Indiana, William and Helen Koerting House (1936)
 Durham, North Carolina, Douglas M. and Grace Knight House (1966)
 Lake Jackson, Texas, Alden B. Dow Office and Lake Jackson City Hall, 101 S. Parking Place, NRHP-listed

Awards
 Diplome de Grand Prix at the Paris Exposition of 1937 for best residential design in the world, based on his own home and design studio and also the John Whitman residence
 Received honorary degrees from Albion College, Hillsdale College, Michigan State University, Northwood University and the University of Michigan.
 In 1957 became a Fellow in the American Institute of Architects (AIA).
 Awarded The Michigan Society of Architects Gold Medal for 1960.
 The Northwood University Alden B. Dow Creativity Center was founded in 1978 to honor and perpetuate his commitment to quality and innovation.
 First recipient of the Frank Lloyd Wright Creativity Award in 1982.
 In 1983 named Architect Laureate of his home state of Michigan.
 The Alden B. Dow Museum of Science & Art in Midland, Michigan is named in his honor.

Further reading
Maddex, Diane.  Alden B. Dow: Midwestern Modern (Midland, Michigan: Alden B. Dow Home and Studio, 2007). ;

References

External links

 Alden B. Dow Home & Studio
 Dow Howell Gilmore Associates Inc
 Guide to the Alden B. Dow Architecture Study Collection 1932-1951

1904 births
1983 deaths
People from Midland, Michigan
University of Michigan College of Engineering alumni
Columbia Graduate School of Architecture, Planning and Preservation alumni
Architects from Michigan
20th-century American architects
Fellows of the American Institute of Architects